Nowe Warpno Town Hall is a wattle and daub building in Nowe Warpno, West Pomeranian Voivodeship; in Poland. The building has a timber frame (Mur pruski) structure, built in 1697, after a large town fire destroyed the former town hall in 1692. The building has a unique architectural style to the region and is the most known landmark of Nowe Warpno.

References

Police County
City and town halls in Poland